3x3 or three by three may refer to:
3x3 basketball, a variation of basketball played three-a-side
3×3, a 1982 extended play by Genesis
3x3, the classic version of the Rubik's Cube